Vista University, South Africa was established in 1981 by the apartheid government to ensure that urban black South Africans seeking tertiary education would be accommodated within the townships rather than on campuses reserved for other population groups.

Campuses
Its campuses were based in Bloemfontein, Daveyton (East Rand), Mamelodi, Port Elizabeth, Sebokeng, Soweto and Welkom. The administrative head office and the Distance Education Campus (VUDEC) were located in Pretoria.

Expansion
In the late 1990s to early 2000s the Vista University and the University of Central Florida Consortium developed a mutually interactive program designed to:

1) Create a technologically based distance education program sensitive to local challenges, including the enhancement of Vista University's Distance Education Campus Student Support Centres

2) Enhance the capacity of various programs, including the Sociology program and academic staff through appropriate education instruction models, curriculum development, media-based instruction and research agendas.

Closure
The university closed as part of a broader reorganisation of South African universities in the early to mid 2000s . Its facilities and some members of the staff have been merged into other universities, including:
 the Nelson Mandela University,
 the University of the Free State,
 the University of Johannesburg,
 the University of Pretoria,
 the University of South Africa (VUDEC) and
 the Vaal University of Technology.

Notable staff and alumni
 Paul Avis, 1970s professional tennis player and clinical psychologist
 Mark Behr, author
 Alan Clark, CEO of SABMiller
 Kenny Kunene, businessman
 Mcebisi Jonas, Deputy Finance Minister
 Mimy Matimbe, Commander 4 Artillery Regiment
 Roy Matube, Union Chairperson-Vista nationality 
Ignatius Makgoka, Chief Information Technology Officer and businessman
Buyisiwe Sondezi, first woman in Africa to earn a PhD in Experimental physics

References

Defunct universities and colleges in South Africa
Distance education institutions based in South Africa
Educational institutions established in 1981
1981 establishments in South Africa
Organisations associated with apartheid
Year of disestablishment missing